Dromon Bureau of Shipping is an International Classification Society, providing classification and statutory certification services to ships and other marine structures, based on International Conventions, Rules and Regulations.

DBS maintains a Quality Management System applicable to Classification of Ships and Vessels / Statutory Marine Certification Services.
The System has been assessed and registered by NQA against the provisions of BS EN 9001:2008.

Authorisations
Dromon Bureau of Shipping is authorized by the below-mentioned Flag Administrations to act on their behalf to conduct surveys and issue certificates in accordance with the International Maritime Organization Resolution A.739(18) and International Conventions, Codes as well as National Requirements pertaining to ship safety and the prevention of marine pollution:

 Belize
 Moldova
 Sierra Leone
 Tanzania
 Togo
 Panama

Major International Conventions and Codes relevant to surveying and certification
 International Convention on Tonnage Measurement of Ships (TONNAGE)
 International Convention on Load Lines (ILL)
 International Convention for the Safety of Life at Sea (SOLAS)
 Convention on the International Regulations for Preventing Collisions at Sea (COLREG)
 International Convention for the Prevention of Pollution from Ships (MARPOL)
 International Management Code for the Safe Operation of Ships and for Pollution Prevention (ISM Code)
 International Ship and Port Facility Security Code (ISPS Code)
 Code of Safe Practice for Solid Bulk Cargoes (BC Code)
 International Grain Code (Grain Code)
 Anti-fouling
 Cargo Gear, ILO Convention 152

Ship Surveying
Dromon applies IMO MSC.208(81) for exclusive surveyors and auditors.

Location
Surveyors are available in Belgium, Croatia, Cyprus, Egypt, Greece, Jordan, Romania, Turkey, U.A.E.

See also

 Classification Society
 Marine Surveyor
 Naval Architecture
 International Maritime Organization

External links
International Association of Classfification Societies
International Maritime Organization

Ship classification societies
Naval architecture